Edward Elliot Elson (born 1934 in Norfolk, Virginia) is a non-career appointee who was the American ambassador extraordinary and plenipotentiary to Denmark from 1993 until 1998.  Elson was also a faculty and board member of the University of Virginia and Chairman of the Board of the following: Bank of Gordon County; Elsonýs; Atlanta News Agency, Inc.; W.H. Smith Holdings (USA); and, The Majestic Wine Corp.

When the Soviet Union fell, the long term power dynamics in the region shifted.  Eight countries in Scandinavia and the Baltics formed to create the Nordic-Baltic Eight (NB8) to help the Baltic's transition.  As Ambassador, Elson “helped to strengthen the bonds of the Nordic-Baltic region and secure American alliances in the region.”

Elson attended Phillips Academy, the University of Virginia, and law school at Emory University.  His father was a book seller and periodical distributor. When Elson finished his education, he took over the family business.

Career
Elson is said to have “pioneered retail outlets in airports and hotels”as well as train stations. His civic accomplishments include being Charter Trustee of Phillips Academy, director of Hampton Investments, Rector of the University of Virginia, First Chairman of National Public Radio and Chairman of the Jewish Publication Society.

References

1934 births
Living people
People from Norfolk, Virginia
Ambassadors of the United States to Denmark
Phillips Academy alumni
University of Virginia alumni
Emory University School of Law alumni